Pilot is a surname. Notable people with the surname include:

  (b. 1962), Cameroon-French radio host for Radio France Internationale
  (b. 1974), French television executive, founder of Nolife (TV channel)
 Ann Hobson Pilot, American classical harpist
 , French musician, keyboardist for Indochine (band)
 Louis Pilot (1940-2016), Luxembourgian footballer and manager
 Mike Pilot ("Tha Mike", born 1975), American broadcaster
 Paul Pilot, Northern Ireland musician
 Rajesh Pilot (1945 - 2000), Indian politician, father of Sachin
 Robert Pilot a.k.a. Robert Wakeham Pilot (1898-1967), Canadian artist
 Sachin Pilot (born 1977), Indian politician, son of Rajesh
Steve Pilot (born 1980) German Model, fitness trainer, nutritionist and author.